Annabella Gordon may refer to:

Annabella of Scotland, married name Annabella Gordon, daughter of James I of Scotland
Annabella Brydon Gordon, mother of James Butler, 7th Marquess of Ormonde

See also
Anna Gordon (disambiguation)